Sturgeon Heights, Alberta may refer to:

Sturgeon Heights, Alberta, a locality in Greenview No. 16, Alberta
Sturgeon Heights, Sturgeon County, Alberta, a locality in Sturgeon County, Alberta